Abram Irvin McDowell (1793–1844) was the 15th mayor of Columbus, Ohio.  He was the 14th person to hold the office, and served for less than one year.  His successor was Smithson E. Wright.  There are no existing images of Abram I. McDowell.

Life 
Abram Irvin McDowell was born on April 24, 1793, in Mercer County, Kentucky, to Col. Samuel McDowell, jr. and Anne (Irvine) McDowell.  He had two brothers, John Adair and William Adair McDowell.

McDowell was married to Eliza Selden (Lord) McDowell.  The couple had three children.

He died on November 16, 1844, in Columbus, Ohio.  He is buried at Green Lawn Cemetery in Columbus, Ohio.

References

Bibliography

Further reading

External links

Abram Irvin McDowell at Political Graveyard

1793 births
1844 deaths
Burials at Green Lawn Cemetery (Columbus, Ohio)
19th-century American politicians
Mayors of Columbus, Ohio